UQCR11 (ubiquinol-cytochrome c reductase, complex III sub-unit XI) is a protein that in humans is encoded by the UQCR11 gene. UQCR11 is the smallest known component of Complex III in the mitochondrial respiratory chain.

Structure 

The UQCR11 gene, located on the p arm of chromosome 19 in position 13.3, is made up of 3 exons and is 8,329 base pairs in length. The UQCR11 protein weighs 6.6 kDa and is composed of 56 amino acids. This gene encodes the smallest known component of the ubiquinol-cytochrome c reductase complex, which is also known as Complex III and is part of the mitochondrial respiratory chain. In vertebrates, Complex III contains 11 sub-units: 3 respiratory sub-units, 2 core proteins and 6 low-molecular weight proteins. Proteobacterial complexes may contain as few as three sub-units.

Function 

The UQCR11 protein may function as a binding factor for the iron-sulfur protein in Complex III, which is ubiquitous in human cells. Complex III catalyzes the chemical reaction

QH2 + 2 ferricytochrome c  Q + 2 ferrocytochrome c + 2 H+

Thus, the two substrates of Complex III are dihydroquinone (QH2) and ferri- (Fe3+) cytochrome c, whereas its 3 products are quinone (Q), ferro- (Fe2+) cytochrome c, and H+. This complex belongs to the family of oxidoreductases, specifically those acting on diphenols and related substances as donor with a cytochrome as acceptor.  This enzyme participates in oxidative phosphorylation.  It has four cofactors: cytochrome c1, cytochrome b-562, cytochrome b-566 and a 2-Iron ferredoxin of the Rieske type.

References

Human proteins